Ata Behlakeh (also Romanized as ‘Aţā Behlakeh) is a village in Nezamabad Rural District, in the Central District of Azadshahr County, Golestan Province, Iran. At the 2006 census, its population was 464, in 112 families.

References 

Populated places in Azadshahr County